Lindrit Kamberi (born 7 October 1999) is a Swiss professional footballer who plays as a centre-back for FC Zürich in the Swiss Super League.

Career

Zürich
A graduate of the club's youth academy, Kamberi began his senior career with hometown club FC Zürich in 2019, signing a three-year senior contract with the club. After several loan spells, Kamberi made his competitive debut for the club on 25 April 2021, coming on as an 84th-minute substitute for Nathan Cardoso in a 3–1 defeat to Luzern.

Loan at Wil
In July 2019, Kamberi was loaned to Swiss Challenge League club FC Wil for the 2019–20 season. He made his league debut for the club just days after the transfer's completion, playing the entirety of a 1–0 victory over Chiasso on 20 July. Kamberi would make 34 appearances in all competitions before returning to Zürich in August 2020.

Loan at Winterthur
Prior to the 2020–21 campaign, Kamberi was loaned out once again, joining FC Winterthur. He made his competitive debut for the club on 12 September 2020 in a 2–1 victory over Tuggen in the Swiss Cup. Later that season, he scored his first professional goal, scoring the first in a 3–2 league victory over his former club, Wil. In March, after a series of injuries at Zürich, Kamberi was recalled from his loan, having made 28 appearances in all competitions with Winterthur.

International career
Kamberi was born in Switzerland and is of Kosovan descent. He is a youth international for Switzerland.

Career statistics

Club

References

External links
Lindrit Kamberi at FC Zürich

1999 births
Living people
Swiss men's footballers
Association football defenders
Switzerland youth international footballers
Swiss Super League players
Swiss Challenge League players
FC Zürich players
FC Wil players
FC Winterthur players
Footballers from Zürich
Swiss people of Kosovan descent